The Newmanry was a section at Bletchley Park, the British codebreaking station during World War II. Its job was to develop and employ statistical and machine methods in cryptanalysis of the Lorenz cipher. It worked very closely with the Testery where a complementary set of operations were performed to complete the decryption of each message. Formally called the Statistical section, it was known as the Newmanry after its founder and head, Max Newman. It was responsible for the various Robinson machines and the ten Colossus computers. Some of the cryptanalysts had joint appointments with the Testery.

Initially in June 1943 the section was small: Good, Mitchie, two engineers and sixteen Wrens in a small hut. By the end of the war there were 26 cryptographers, 28 engineers, 273 Wrens with ten Colossi, three Robinsons, three Tunnies, plus twenty small electronic and electrical machines.

See also
 Fish
 Allen Coombs 
 Tommy Flowers 
 Jack Good 
 Peter Hilton 
 Donald Michie 
 Bill Tutte

References

Sources
 Ashcroft, M. (ca. 1945), "Newmanry Addresses (incomplete)" The Papers of Max Newman, Box 3/2/1, St John's College Library, Cambridge UK
 
 
  That version is a facsimile copy, but there is a transcript of much of this document in '.pdf' format at: , and a web transcript of Part 1 at: 
 

Bletchley Park